This is a list of episodes of the British courtroom drama, Rumpole of the Bailey.

Series overview

Episodes
All listed dates indicate first UK transmission date

Special (1975)

 This was a stand-alone production in 1975 for BBC TV's anthology series Play for Today. Duration: circa 65 minutes. It inspired the seven-series TV show that aired 1978–1992.  Though not conceived as such, it was a de facto "pilot" for the subsequent TV series.

 Re-titled "Rumpole and the Confession of Guilt" for radio adaptation in 1980 and for DVD release in 2007.  It was adapted into literary form by John Mortimer and published along with all six of the specially-written new scripts from the 1980 radio series in the 1981 book Regina V. Rumpole (Re-published in 1982 under the title Rumpole For The Defence).

Series 1 (1978)

All six stories in TV series one were adapted into literary form by John Mortimer and published in the 1978 book Rumpole of the Bailey

Series 2 (1979)

Special (1980)

This production was created as a stand-alone, feature-length special in 1980. Duration: circa 103 minutes. It aired between series two and series three.  It was adapted into literary form by John Mortimer and published in the 1980 book Rumpole's Return

Series 3 (1983)

All six stories in TV series three were adapted into literary form by John Mortimer and published in the 1983 book Rumpole and the Golden Thread

Series 4 (1987)

All six stories in TV series four were adapted into literary form by John Mortimer and published in the 1987 book Rumpole's Last Case

Series 5 (1988)

All six stories in TV series five were adapted into literary form by John Mortimer and published in the 1988 book Rumpole and the Age of Miracles

Series 6 (1991)

All six stories in TV series six were adapted into literary form by John Mortimer and published in the 1990 book Rumpole à la Carte

Series 7 (1992)

All six stories in TV series seven were adapted into literary form by John Mortimer and published in the 1992 book Rumpole on Trial

References

External links
 

Works by John Mortimer